Bassem Yakhour (born 16 August 1971 in Latakia, Syria) is a Syrian actor, writer and director.

Career
Born in Latakia, Baseem Yakhour graduated from Higher Institute of Dramatic Art in 1993 and joined the Syrian actor's syndicate on February 16, 1999. Since 1993, Yakhour has acted in many television series, stage productions and theater. He was also a television presenter for a short time for a show called "Charisma".

Today, he is best known for the Spotlight series for which he co-writes and acts. The latter was an important contribution to Syrian art, although the critics were very harsh.

Syria for Arts International productions describes the series as follows: "A drama work of diverse social subjects, screened through special comedy frame based mainly on making fun of social degeneration, lying, and hot life-contradictions, and also on deep meditation over human and establishment behavior, etc".

A diverse actor, his work in the Spotlight television series was critical as it gained notoriety when it tackled political issues, such as fraud, lying, and as it tackled social issues such as unemployment and bureaucracy.

Bassem Yakhour is one of the few Arabic actors who are capable of performing in both comedy and tragedy. "Six Stars Family" and "Hero of this Time" are examples of Yakhour's ability to make people laugh, although the jokes touch their wounds and sorrows. "Salahiddin", "Saqr Quraysh" and "The Spring of Cordoba" are examples of Yakhour's capability to perform tragedic roles in both historical or modern genres.

Personal life
Bassem Yakhour is married to Rana Al-Hariri and they have a son, Roy.

Selected filmography
1993–"The Storm", actor, film for the Syrian television
1994–"Six Stars family", actor, television series for Al-Sham Arts production, in which he gained tremendous popularity, next to Ayman Ridah, in which he keeps in touch in his career.
1994–"Al-Thuraya", actor, historical series for Bosra for Art.
1994–"Servant of Two Masters", actor, film representing the High Institute for Dramatic Arts.
1995–"The Bird", actor, television series for Arab international productions.
1996–"The Handcuff", actor, drama series for Arab international productions.
1997–"Seven Stars family", actor, television series for Al-Sham Arts.
1998–"Brothers of Dust", actor, drama series for Al-Sham Arts.
1999–"Hero of his time", actor, comedy series for Al-Sham Arts production.
2000–"Spotlight, part 1", actor, co-writer, television series for Syria for Arts production.
2001–"Spotlight, part 2", actor, co-writer, television series for Syria for Arts production.
2001–"Salahiddin", actor, historical series for Syria for Arts production.
2001–"Mabash Ana", special appearance in Asalah Nasri's video clip.
2002–"Spotlight, part 3", actor, co-writer, television series for Syria for Arts production.
2002–"Saqr Quraysh", actor, historical series for Syria for Arts production.
2003–"Spring of Cordoba", actor, historical series for Syria for Arts production.
2004–"Homy Hon", actor and director, series for Al-Sham Arts production.
2004–"Spotlight, part 4", actor and co-writer for Syria for Arts production.
2004–"Hasna", special appearance in Ali Deek's video clip.
2005–"Arabiyat 2005", actor and co-writer (announced)
and he is also acts in the new serial that is viewed in Ramadan called Khalid ibn al-Walid

2005–"Khalf Elkudban",actor,drama series written by "Habi Elsa3di", directed by,"Allith Hajjo".
2006–"Khalid ibn al-Walid" actor,historical series written by "Abd elkareem Nasif",directed by,"Mohammad Azizieh".
2007–"Fajroun AKHAR" actor,a drama series written by, "FADI KOSHUKJI", directed by, "FIRAS DHNI".
2007–"JARIMA BILA NIHAYA" actor,a detective series written by,"TAREK BRNJKJI "and directed by,"NABIL SHAMS"
2007–"WASMET 3AR" actor,a drama series written by "Dr. Fathalla OUMAR", directed by, "Naji TOUMEH".
2007-Egyptian film "KHALIJ NEMA",actor, written by "AHMAD AL BEH", and directed by, "MAJDI AL HAWARI".
2008–"Jar AL RIDA" actor,a comedy series written by "Dr. MAMDOUH HAMADA", directed by, "ALLAITH HAJJO".
2008–"alkhat alahmar" actor, a drama series written by "Hani Elsa3di",directed by,"Yousef Rezek".
2008-Egyptian political series "Zel Almuhareb" actor, written by "basheer Eldeek",directed by "Nader Galal".

References

External links
Official website of Syrian actor Bassem Yakhour
Syrian for Arts International production

1971 births
Living people
Syrian Christians
Syrian male television actors
People from Latakia
Higher Institute of Dramatic Arts (Damascus) alumni
20th-century Syrian male actors
21st-century Syrian male actors
21st-century Syrian writers
20th-century Syrian writers